The International Netball Federation (INF) has over 70 members spanning all corners of the globe. Membership is split into five Regional Federations including the Africa, Americas, Asia, Europe and Oceania.

Full Member Associations

Oceania
  (Netball Australia)
  (Cook Islands Netball Association)
  (Netball Fiji)
  (Netball New Zealand)
  (Papua New Guinea Netball Association)
  (Samoa Netball Association)
  (Vanuatu Netball Association)

Africa
  (Botswana Netball Association)
  (Netball Association of Ghana)
  (Kenya Netball Association)
  (Netball Association of Lesotho)
  (Netball Association of Malawi)
  (Netball Namibia)
  (Netball South Africa)
  (Netball Swaziland) (now Eswatini) (now Netball Eswatini)
  (Netball Association of Tanzania)
  (Uganda Netball Federation)
  (Netball Association of Zambia)
  (Zimbabwe Netball Association)

Europe
  (England Netball)
  (Gibraltar Netball Association)
  (Malta Netball Association)
  (Netball Northern Ireland)
  (Netball Ireland)
  (Netball Scotland)
  (Swiss Netball)
  (Welsh Netball Association)

Asia
 
 
  (Hong Kong Netball Association)
  (Netball Federation of India)
 
  (Malaysia Netball Association)
  (Netball Association of the Maldives)
 
  (Pakistan Federation of Netball)
  (Netball Philippines)
  (Netball Singapore)
  (Netball Federation of Sri Lanka)

Americas & Caribbean
  (Antigua and Barbuda Netball Association)
  (Netball Federation of Argentina)
  (Bahamas Netball Federation)
  (Barbados Netball Association)
  (Bermuda Netball Association)
  (Canadian Amateur Netball Association)
  (Cayman Islands Netball Association)
  (Grenada Netball Association)
  (Jamaica Netball Association)
  (Saint Kitts and Nevis Netball Association)
  (Saint Lucia National Netball Association)
  (Saint Vincent and the Grenadines Netball Association)
  (Trinidad and Tobago Netball Association)
  (United States of America Netball Association)

Associate members

 Abu Dhabi
 Dubai

 (Niue Island Netball Association)

 (Solomon Islands Netball Federation)

References
 

International netball teams
National Teams